Eldorado Township may refer to the following townships in the United States:

 Eldorado Township, McDonough County, Illinois
 Eldorado Township, Minnesota
 Eldorado Township, Benton County, Iowa
 Eldorado Township, Clay County, Nebraska
 Eldorado Township, Harlan County, Nebraska
 Eldorado Township, Montgomery County, North Carolina

See also 
 El Dorado Township, Butler County, Kansas

Township name disambiguation pages